The Alpine Loop Back Country Byway is a rugged  Back Country Byway and Colorado Scenic and Historic Byway located in the high San Juan Mountains of Hindale, Ouray, and San Juan counties, Colorado, USA. The byway connects the mountain towns of Lake City, Ouray, and Silverton. The byway features high mountain passes, alpine tundra, beautiful mountain meadows, ghost towns, and relics of the silver mining era. While the meadows and tundra are accessible to ordinary passenger vehicles, a high-clearance 4-wheel drive vehicle is required to travel the entire route.

The Silverton Historic District and the Shenandoah-Dives (Mayflower) Mill are National Historic Landmarks. The Alpine Loop connects with the San Juan Skyway Scenic and Historic Byway at Ouray and Silverton.


Route
The Alpine Loop is generally considered to begin and end at Lake City. From there the route commonly followed is west over Cinnamon Pass or Engineer Pass to Animas Forks, and then returning east back to Lake City. The clockwise circuit starting with Cinnamon Pass generally puts the vehicle on the inside "lane" of the mountainous portions with the driver on the outside, providing a better view of the relative position of the vehicle and the outer edge of the road at the top of the drop-off.
 The counter-clockwise direction is preferable for less powerful 4-wheel drive vehicles that may have a difficult time ascending steep sections on the western portion of Engineer Pass.

Major intersections

Gallery

See also

History Colorado
List of scenic byways in Colorado
Scenic byways in the United States

Notes

References

External links

America's Scenic Byways: Colorado
Bureau of Land Management Back Country Byways
BLM Alpine Loop website
Colorado Department of Transportation
Colorado Scenic & Historic Byways Commission
Colorado Scenic & Historic Byways
Colorado Travel Map
Colorado Tourism Office
History Colorado

Colorado Scenic and Historic Byways
Bureau of Land Management Back Country Byways
Back Country Byways in Colorado
Bureau of Land Management areas in Colorado
San Juan National Forest
San Juan Mountains (Colorado)
Transportation in Colorado
Transportation in Hinsdale County, Colorado
Transportation in Ouray County, Colorado
Transportation in San Juan County, Colorado
Tourist attractions in Colorado
Tourist attractions in Hinsdale County, Colorado
Tourist attractions in Ouray County, Colorado
Tourist attractions in San Juan County, Colorado
U.S. Route 550